Büyükçekmece Tepecikspor, formerly Tepecik Belediyespor, is a Turkish sports club in Büyükçekmece, the outer borough at eastern side of Istanbul metropolitan area, that currently plays in the TFF Third League. The club's colours are green and white.

Former footballers

Serkan Burak Tektaş (also known as Alişan, locally renowned singer and actor, notable for his lead role in TV series Aynalı Tahir)

External links 
Official website
Tepecikspor on TFF.org

Football clubs in Istanbul
1988 establishments in Turkey
Association football clubs established in 1988